The Mind Science Foundation (MSF) is a private non-profit scientific foundation in San Antonio, Texas, USA, established by the philanthropist Thomas Baker Slick in 1958.

The Foundation's mission is to raise awareness and levels of funding for one of the major unsolved questions in science: how consciousness arises in human beings.

Awards and sponsorship of research
MSF is a principal, international supporter of pilot data grants for consciousness research. Some recent award recipients include:

Fred Gage – Salk Institute for Biological Studies
Susan Greenfield – Oxford University
Christof Koch – California Institute of Technology
V.S. Ramachandran – University of California San Diego

Lecture events
In addition to funding leading researchers in the field, the Mind Science Foundation hosts a Distinguished Speakers Series to heighten public awareness of practical topics related to human consciousness. Examples of past speakers include:

Jonas Salk – inaugural speaker, Distinguished Speakers Series 
Steven Laureys – University of Liege, Belgium
J. Allan Hobson - Harvard Medical School
Kay Redfield Jamison Johns Hopkins University School of Medicine
Temple Grandin – Colorado State University
Jane Goodall – Goodall Institute

Sponsoring events
The Foundation also supports international symposia and conferences focused on the scientific study of consciousness and has also helped to sponsor events with the following organizations:

Association for the Scientific Study of Consciousness
ASSC-8 Satellite meeting (Antwerp, 2004): "Coma and Impaired Consciousness"
ASSC-9 (Caltech, 2005)
ASSC-10 (Oxford, 2006)
Mind and Life Institute 
Public Meeting with the Dalai Lama (M.I.T., 2003)
Public Meeting with the Dalai Lama (Washington, D. C., 2005)

See also
Association for the Scientific Study of Consciousness

References

External links
Official website

Consciousness studies
Companies based in San Antonio
Organizations established in 1958
1958 establishments in Texas